Peter X. Fugina (August 28, 1908 – March 28, 1994) was an American politician and educator.

Fugina was born in Biwabik, Minnesota and graduated from Aurora High School in Aurora, Minnesota. He served in the United States Navy during World War II. He received his degree in chemistry from Hamline University. Fugina also went to Princeton University, Purdue University, the University of Minnesota, Stanford University, and the University of Washington. He lived in Virginia, Minnesota, with his wife and family,  and taught chemistry at the Ely Community College and in the St. Louis County School system. Fugina served in the Minnesota House of Representatives from 1955 to 1962 and from 1971 to 1978. He was a Democrat. Fugina died from pneumonia and from Parkinson's disease at Lakeview Memorial Hospital in Stillwater, Minnesota. He was buried at Fort Snelling National Cemetery.

References

1908 births
1994 deaths
People from St. Louis County, Minnesota
Military personnel from Minnesota
Educators from Minnesota
Hamline University alumni
Princeton University alumni
Purdue University alumni
Stanford University alumni
University of Minnesota alumni
University of Washington alumni
Deaths from Parkinson's disease
Democratic Party members of the Minnesota House of Representatives
United States Navy personnel of World War II